The 2018 Women's World Chess Championship Match was a match held between Tan Zhongyi, the 2017 Women's World Chess champion, and her challenger Ju Wenjun to determine the new women's world chess champion. Ju Wenjun qualified by winning the FIDE Women's Grand Prix 2015–16.

The match took place from 2 to 20 May 2018 and was played in two halves, the first in Shanghai, the latter in Chongqing. Ju Wenjun won 5½ - 4½.

Competitors

2015–16 Grand Prix winner
The challenger qualified by winning the FIDE Women's Grand Prix 2015–16. Hou Yifan had won the first tournament but then withdrew from the Grand Prix.  After four of five tournaments, the leader was Koneru Humpy with 335 points, who had already played her three tournaments. In second place followed Ju Wenjun with 253⅓ and one event left. The final tournament was held from 11 to 31 October 2016, and Ju Wenjun won the tournament convincingly, thus overtaking Koneru Humpy. Koneru Humpy thereby finished overall runner-up for the fourth time.

2017 knock-out world champion
The winner of the Women's World Chess Championship 2017 has the right to defend her title in the match. The 64 player knockout tournament was initially scheduled for October 2016, but postponed due to a lack of an organizer. The tournament was played in Teheran, Iran, from 10 to 28 February 2017.

Ju Wenjun advanced to the quarter-finals, where she was knocked-out. Had she won, challenger would have been the Grand Prix runner-up Koneru Humpy.

The final was played between Tan Zhongyi and Anna Muzychuk as a four-game match. After a calm draw in game 1, Tan Zhongyi won game 2 with the white pieces.

Head-to-head record
Prior to the match the two players had met 16 times at classical time control. Tan Zhongyi lead the pairing having won 3, drawn 11 and lost 2 games.

Match
The match was contested over ten games at classical time control, with additional rapid and blitz tie-breaks if needed.

Colors were drawn at the opening ceremony. Colors are also reversed after game 4 to even out an advantage of first playing white. The time control is set at 90 minutes for the first 40 moves with addition of 30 minutes for the rest of the game. There is an increment of 30 seconds per move from move 1.

Schedule

Shanghai
Opening ceremony: May 2 (Draw of Colors)
Game 1: May 3
Game 2: May 4
Game 3: May 6
Game 4: May 7
Game 5: May 9

Chongqing
Game 6: May 12
Game 7: May 13
Game 8: May 15
Game 9: May 16
Game 10: May 18
Closing ceremony: May 19

Results

Future
Due to various hosting and timing issues, the championships had varied from their intended annual calendar, pushing the 2017 event into early 2018. FIDE's plan is to get back on schedule by holding a second Women's World Chess Championship 2018 (tournament), with the full 64 player knock-out in November, culminating with the final two players competing for the championship title. The event was held in Khanty-Mansiysk, Russia. Ju Wenjun entered the tournament as top rated player.

References

External links
Official website
Match regulations

Women's World Chess Championships
2018 in chess
2018 in Chinese sport
Chess in China
International sports competitions hosted by China
Sports competitions in Shanghai
Sport in Chongqing
May 2018 sports events in China